Admiral Sir Andrew Mitchell, KB (1757 – 26 February 1806) was an admiral of the blue in the Royal Navy. He married Mary Uniacke (daughter of Richard John Uniacke) in Halifax, Nova Scotia on 3 May 1805.

Career
Mitchell entered service in 1771 as a midshipman on HMS Deal Castle. He was promoted to lieutenant in 1776, while serving in the West Indies and again promoted to post-captain, skipping the rank of commander, after distinguishing himself in action in 1778.

He distinguished himself again while serving with the 1782 expedition of Sir Edward Hughes in India. On 12 August 1782, Mitchell was captain of the frigate , when she encountered the French frigate Bellone off Friars Hood, Ceylon. After two-and-a-half hours, Bellone sailed away. Coventry had suffered 15 men killed and 29 wounded in the engagement.

When Hughes returned to England, he left Mitchell in charge of the East Indies Station as commodore. Mitchell returned to England in 1786.

In February, 1795 he received command of a ship in the Channel fleet of Admiral Howe. In June, 1795 he was promoted rear-admiral of the blue, and in 1799 vice-admiral and given the command of Sheerness.

In August, 1799 he conducted the naval part of the Anglo-Russian invasion of Holland. Here he obtained the surrender of a squadron of the navy of the Batavian Republic in the Vlieter Incident.

For his service in this expedition he was appointed Knight Companion of the Order of the Bath, with his own ribbon (no stall being vacant at this time) by King George III in 1800. He was voted the thanks of Parliament, and the City of London presented him with a sword of honour at a value of 100 guineas.

He was commander-in-chief of the North America and West Indies Station from 1802 to his death in 1806. His wife Mary died years later and was buried in the crypt of St. Paul's Church (Halifax, Nova Scotia).

In 1805 he was raised to the rank of admiral of the blue. He died in Bermuda after a severe illness on 26 February 1806.

Sources

References
 (1844) Historical and statistical account of Dunfermline, Edinburgh and London, William Blackwood & Sons, pp. 306–307

|-

Royal Navy personnel of the American Revolutionary War
Royal Navy personnel of the French Revolutionary Wars
Royal Navy admirals
Knights Companion of the Order of the Bath
1757 births
1806 deaths